The 1979 South Australian Open, also known by its sponsored name Berri Fruit Juices South Australian Open, was a men's ATP tennis tournament held at the Memorial Drive Park in Adelaide, Australia. It was the 78th edition of the tournament and was held from 10 December until 16 December 1979. Third-seeded Kim Warwick won the singles title.

Finals

Singles

 Kim Warwick defeated  Bernard Mitton 7–6(7–3), 6–4
 It was Warwick's 2nd title of the year and the 10th of his career.

Doubles

 Colin Dibley /  Chris Kachel defeated  John Alexander /  Phil Dent 6–7, 7–6, 6–4
 It was Dibley's 2nd title of the year and the 18th of his career. It was Kachel's only title of the year and the 2nd of his career.

References

 

 
South Australian Open
South Australian Open, 1979
South Australian Open
South Australian Open